The Roman villa of Rabaçal in Rabaçal near Penela was located near the Roman road from Olisipo (Lisbon ) to Bracara Augusta (Braga) in Portugal.
The excavations begun in 1984 exposed the layout of a villa, the center of which is an octagonal peristyle around which the other rooms are grouped symmetrically. The pars rustica (economic area) was located in the north, the pars urbana (living area) in the western areas. The mosaics which are covered today for protection form a separate group. They are figurative :the seasons, quadriga, a seated female figure
and some of the geometrical and vegetal compositions differ from any others existing in Portugal.

References
M. Pessoa, L. Madeira et al. Römische Villa Rabaçal. Penela 1993
Thomas G. Schattner (Hrsg.) Archäologischer Wegweiser durch Portugal, Philipp von Zabern, Mainz 1998 S. 108.  (Kulturgeschichte der Antiken Welt, Band 74).

External links
Roman Villa of Rabaçal Museum

Roman villas in Portugal
National monuments in Coimbra District